Negele Borana  or Neghelle, is a town and separate woreda in southern Ethiopia. Located in the east borena zone of the Oromia Region on the road connecting Addis Ababa to Dolo Odo, it is the largest town in the east borana zone traditionally inhabited by the borana oromo. Specifically the town's inhabitants are mostly Soldiers and their families plus traders from different tribes living there since the HaileSillasie Regime. Negele Borana principal importance is that a barrack revolt in this town is considered the first incident of the Ethiopian Revolution.
Moyale town is greatly affected by the regional clashes between Borana and the Somali community.

Overview 
The town is reported to have telephone service, a post office and electricity, as well as at least one primary and one secondary school, but no financial institutions. The electrical power was introduced by a branch of the Ethiopian Electric Light and Power Authority (EELPA), and in January 1961 a diesel-driven 120 kW electric power plant for the town was completed. A 2004 report states that Negele Borana is supplied with electricity by the Ethiopian Electric Power Corporation (the successor utility to the EELPA) from the national grid. There is also an airport. Negele Borana Military Base, an important installation of the Ethiopian Army, is located to the northeast.

Philip Briggs describes Negele Borana as "something of a frontier town, a cultural boiling pot that is predominantly Oromo but also has strong Somali, and Muslim influences. ...  Negele Borana's distinctive character and cultural blend are personified in one of the most lively and absorbing markets in East Africa -- especially on Sundays when the camel market is held."

History 
The town of Negele Borana was founded in the early 20th century; the Swedish doctor F. Hylander described it in 1934 as an "Amhara new settlement and fortress with palisades", which was "the farthest outpost towards Jubbaland".

At the beginning of the Second Italo-Ethiopian War from 4 October 1935, Negele Borana served as the headquarters of Ras Desta Damtew. The Italians subjected the town to frequent bombing raids. The Italians under General Rodolfo Graziani captured the town shortly after their victory at the Battle of Ganale Dorya, which further weakened the southern Ethiopian defenses.

The town was occupied by the British Gold Coast Brigade on 27 March 1941, who had pushed north from Dolo. The British colonial unit found that the Italians had abandoned the settlement 10 days before they arrived, and in the time between the buildings had been looted and destroyed by the neighboring Borena Oromo. By the time David Buxton visited Negele Borana in 1943, he found that a battalion of the Ethiopian Army had garrisoned this "half-built Italian settlement".

The Norwegian Lutheran Mission operated a station in Negele Borana from 1949. Their most important activity was to start a hospital for the town in one of the abandoned Italian buildings, which they operated until 1956 when the Ministry of Public Health took it over. In 1958, Negele  Borana was one of 27 places in Ethiopia ranked as First Class Township.

On 12 January 1974, enlisted men and non-commissioned officers of the Fourth Brigade stationed at the Military Base protested over their substandard living conditions. "There was nothing new about discontent among soldiers serving in the desolate conditions in these far-flung garrisons," note Marina and David Ottaway. "The heat was unbearable, the food barely edible, and the water was bad or in short supply". The last straw was when the officers refused to let the soldiers use their well after their own water pump   broke down. The soldiers arrested their superior officers and petitioned Emperor Haile Selassie for redress of their grievances. The Emperor sent Lieutenant-General Deresse Dubale to investigate the matter; the mutineers took him prisoner, forced him to eat and drink as they did, then tied him up and put him under a tree for eight hours while they negotiated with the defense ministry. Furious, the Emperor sent two bombers to overfly the garrison and intimidate them to release Deresse, but did not punish the soldiers. The whole incident was hushed up for a while.

During the Ogaden War, the Somali Army attempted to capture Negele Borana throughout August 1977, but the local garrison was able to beat back the attacks.

Rights activists in southern Oromia reported to Human Rights Watch that students, farmers, and business people had been detained in Negele Borana. As of 25 January 2010 several hundred people, mostly affiliated with the Oromo People's Congress, were said to be still incarcerated in Negele borana jail. These arrests reportedly were in response to protests about the activities of mining companies in the region, which the authorities attributed to the opposition.

Climate
Negele Borana has an altitude-moderated hot semi-arid climate (Köppen BSh), resembling Kenya rather than more northerly parts of Ethiopia.

Demographics 
The 2007 national census reported a total population for this town of 35,264, of whom 18,351 were men and 16,913 were women. The majority of the inhabitants said they were Muslim, with 54.89% of the population reporting they observed this belief, while 34.25% of the population practiced Ethiopian Orthodox Christianity, 8.24% were Protestant, and 2.34% practiced traditional beliefs.
The 1994 national census reported this town had a total population of 23,997 of whom 12,036 were men and 11,961 women.

Notes 

Populated places in the Oromia Region
Ethiopia
Cities and towns in Ethiopia